Jin'an District is a district of the city of Lu'an, Anhui Province, People's Republic of China. The government of Jin'an District is located on Renmin St.

The district has jurisdiction over three subdistricts, 11 towns and 14 townships.

Administrative divisions
In the present, Jin'an District hasfive subdistricts, 11 towns and six townships.
 Subdistricts

Towns

Townships

References

External links
 Official website of Jin'an District government

County-level divisions of Anhui
 
Lu'an